Eva Fools Around is a Czech comedy film directed by Martin Frič. It was released in 1939.

Plot
Eva Norová goes to visit her aunt Pa for her 60th birthday. Pa's wish is to learn how to grow the kind of roses that her neighbour, factory owner Záhorský has cultivated. However, aunt Pa is not on friendly terms with her neighbour. Eva applies for a job as a secretary in order to steal the instructions for growing the roses. Meanwhile, Eva's brother Michal, who has fallen in love with Záhorský's daughter Eliška, also makes his way to the Záhorský residence. Eva in turn falls in love with the Záhorskýs' secretary, Jiří Kučera, who has nestled his way into the family in order to win back his stolen family jewels. When Eva brings the instructions for growing the roses to her aunt, she finds out that she already got them a week earlier from Záhorský's daughter Eliška, and Eva returns the instructions. In the end everything turns out well, the Záhorskýs become friends with aunt Pa and offer her the rose growing instructions themselves, Jiří's family jewels are returned, Michal is engaged to Eliška and Eva gets together with Jiří.

Cast
 Nataša Gollová as Eva Norová
 Oldřich Nový as Michal Nor
 Zdeňka Baldová as Aunt Pa
 Gustav Hilmar as Factory owner Tomáš Záhorský
 Marta Májová as Mrs. Emilie Záhorská
 Jiřina Sedláčková as Eliška Záhorská
 Josef Gruss as Zdeněk Kolář
 Raoul Schránil as Jiří Kučera
 Ella Nollová as Housekeeper Klotylda
 Bolek Prchal as Butler Jan

References

External links
 

1939 films
1930s Czech-language films
1939 comedy films
Czechoslovak black-and-white films
Films directed by Martin Frič
Czechoslovak comedy films
1930s Czech films